Samrala Assembly constituency (Sl. No.: 58) is a Punjab Legislative Assembly constituency in Ludhiana district, Punjab state, India.

Members of the Legislative Assembly

Election results

2022

2017

See also
 List of constituencies of the Punjab Legislative Assembly
 Ludhiana district
 Amrik Singh Dhillon

References

External links
  

Assembly constituencies of Punjab, India
Ludhiana district